Frénois is a commune in the Vosges department in Grand Est in northeastern France.

Geography 
The river Madon forms part of the commune's southeastern border.

See also 
 Communes of the Vosges department

References 

Communes of Vosges (department)